Yitzhak Y. Melamed is an Israeli philosopher and a leading scholar of Spinoza and modern philosophy. He is the Charlotte Bloomberg Professor of Philosophy at Johns Hopkins University. He holds a master's degree in history & philosophy of science from Tel Aviv University and a philosophy PhD from Yale University. Melamed has won numerous fellowships and grants, including the Fulbright (1996-8), American Academy for Jewish Research (2003-5), Mellon (2005), Humboldt (2011), NEH (2012), and ACLS-Burkhardt (2012) Fellowships, and taught intensive masterclasses at the University of Toronto (2016), École normale supérieure de Lyon (2016), Peking University (2017), and the École des hautes études en sciences sociales (2019).

Academic activity
In 2019 he analyzed two manuscripts of the Korte Verhandeling that were discovered in the mid-nineteenth century. The first manuscript was an appendix compiled with the geometrical method of the Spinoza's Ethics, but without providing any definition. The second appendix was presented as the earliest known version of the major work of the Netherlandish philosopher.

From Spinoza's letters he also ascertained that the earliest editions of the Ethics would have been published under the title of ‘Philosophy’.

Books
 Spinoza’s Metaphysics: Substance and Thought (Oxford: Oxford University Press, 2013). xxii+232 pp. Paperback: 2014.
 Solomon Maimon’s Autobiography, translated by Paul Reitter. Edited and introduced by Yitzhak Y. Melamed and Abraham P. Socher (Princeton: Princeton University Press, 2019).
 Blackwell Companion to Spinoza, ed. Yitzhak Y. Melamed (Oxford: Blackwell, 2021). 
 Spinoza’s Political Treatise: A Critical Guide, eds. Yitzhak Y. Melamed and Hasana Sharp (Cambridge: Cambridge University Press, 2018). 
 Spinoza’s Ethics: A Critical Guide, ed. Yitzhak Y. Melamed (Cambridge: Cambridge University Press, 2017). 
 Eternity: A History, ed. Yitzhak Y. Melamed (New York: Oxford University Press, 2016).
 The Young Spinoza: A Metaphysician in the Making, ed. Yitzhak Y. Melamed (Oxford: Oxford University, 2015).
 Spinoza and German Idealism, eds. Eckart Förster and Yitzhak Y. Melamed (Cambridge: Cambridge University Press, 2012).
 Spinoza’s Theological-Political Treatise: A Critical Guide, eds. Yitzhak Y. Melamed and Michael Rosenthal (Cambridge: Cambridge University Press, 2010).

Influential Articles
 “Spinoza’s causa sui” in The Blackwell Companion to Spinoza, ed. Yitzhak Y. Melamed (Oxford: Blackwell, 2021), 116–125. ""
  “The Earliest Draft of Spinoza’s Ethics” in Charles Ramond and Jack Stetter (eds.), Spinoza in 21st-Century French and American Philosophy. Metaphysics, Philosophy of Mind, Moral and Political Philosophy. Bloomsbury, 2019, 93–112.
 “The Building Blocks of Spinoza’s Metaphysics: Substance, Attributes, and Modes” in Michael Della Rocca (ed.), The Oxford Handbook of Spinoza (Oxford: Oxford University Press, 2017), 84–113. 
 “Spinoza’s Metaphysics of Thought: Parallelisms and the Multifaceted Structure of Ideas,” Philosophy & Phenomenological Research 86 (2013), 636–683.
  “Charitable Interpretations and the Political Domestication of Spinoza, or, Benedict in the Land of the Secular Imagination” in Eric Schlisser, Mogens Laerke and Justin Smith (eds.), The Methodology of the History of Philosophy (Oxford: Oxford University Press, 2013), 258–279.
 “Spinoza’s Deification of Existence”, Oxford Studies in Early Modern Philosophy 6 (2012), 75–104.
 “ ‘Omnis determinatio est negatio’ – Determination, Negation and Self-Negation in Spinoza, Kant, and Hegel” in Eckart Förster and Yitzhak Melamed (eds.), Spinoza and German Idealism (Cambridge: Cambridge University Press, 2012), 175–96.
  “Acosmism or Weak Individuals? Hegel, Spinoza, and the Reality of the Finite”, Journal of the History of Philosophy 48 (2010), 77–92.
 “Spinoza’s Metaphysics of Substance: The Substance-Mode Relation as a Relation of Inherence and Predication”, Philosophy & Phenomenological Research (78:1) January 2009, 17–82.
 “Salomon Maimon and the Rise of Spinozism in German Idealism,” Journal of the History of Philosophy 42 (January 2004), 67–96.

External links
 A talk on the first draft of Spinoza's Ethics. Paris 2017.
 Yitzhak Melamed's home page
 Academia.edu page
 2017 Interview at 3AM Magazine.

References

21st-century American philosophers
Jewish philosophers
Living people
Tel Aviv University alumni
Yale University alumni
Johns Hopkins University faculty
1968 births
Spinoza scholars